is a junction passenger railway station located in the city of Tsu, Mie Prefecture, operated by Central Japan Railway Company (JR Central), the private railway operator Kintetsu and the  third sector Ise Railway.  The name of the station is considered the shortest in Japan because it is the only station name that is written with one kana, even though other stations have shorter names when written in Latin letters, such as Oe Station.

Lines
Tsu Station is served by the JR Kisei Main Line, and is located 15.5 rail kilometers from the starting point of the line at Kameyama Station. It is also  from the terminus of the Nagoya Line at Ise-Nakagawa Station.

Station layout
The station consists of four ground-level platforms serving six tracks, connected by pedestrian footbridges. The JR uses one island platform and one side platform and the Kintetsu portion has one island platform. The Ise Railway uses a single bay platform.

Platforms

Adjacent stations

History
Tsu Station opened on November 4, 1891, as a station on the Tsu spur line of the privately owned Kansai Railway. The line was nationalized on October 1, 1907, becoming the Sangū Line of the Japanese Government Railways on October 12, 1909. On April 3, 1932, the Sangū Express Electric Railway began operations at Tsu Station. This line underwent various changes in ownership, eventually becoming the Kintetsu Nagoya Line in 1944. The station was transferred to the control of the Japanese National Railways (JNR) Kisei Main Line on July 15, 1959. The JNR Ise Line began operations on September 1, 1973. The station was absorbed into the JR Central network upon the privatization of the JNR on April 1, 1987, with the Ise Line spun off to the private sector a few days earlier.

Passenger statistics
In fiscal 2019, the JR portion of the station was used by an average of 3,609 passengers daily (boarding passengers only). During the same period, the Kintetsu portion was used by 15,689 passengers and the Ise Railway portion by 1,691 passengers daily.

Surrounding area
Mie Prefectural Office
Tsukairaku Park
Mie Gokoku Shrine
Mie Prefectural Art Museum

See also
List of railway stations in Japan

References

External links

  Tsu Station Official home page - JR Central
 Official home page – Kintetsu  
  Official home page - Ise Railway

Railway stations in Japan opened in 1891
Railway stations in Mie Prefecture
Tsu, Mie